The Togolese Armed Forces (French: Forces Armées Togolaises, FAT) is the national military of the Republic of Togo which consists of the Army, Navy, Air Force, and the National Gendarmerie. The total military expenditure during the fiscal year of 2005 was 1.6% of the country's GDP. Military bases exist in Lomé, Temedja, Kara, Niamtougou, and Dapaong. The current Chief of the General Staff is Brigadier General Dadja Maganawe, who took office on December 6, 2020.

Army 
The current chief of staff of the army is Colonel Blakimwé Wiyao Balli. The elite presidential bodyguards of the Republic of Togo Armed Forces are reportedly trained by Benjamin Yeaten, an internationally wanted Liberian military commander and war criminal.

Equipment

Armor

Air Force 

The Republic of Togo Air Force (French: Armée de l'Air Republic of Togo) was established in 1964, and French influence remains in the choice of aircraft used. Since 2020, the air force's chief of staff is Colonel Tassounti Djato.
The C-47 Skytrain was the first aircraft used; it was part of the force from 1960 to 1976. Replacing the C-47s were two DHC-5D Buffalo STOL transports in 1976. Also in the same year, Togo acquired five ex-German Air Force Fouga Magister armed jet trainers and seven EMB.326GBs from Brazil to form the Escadrille de Chasse. Togo's armed jet trainer fleet was upgraded in 1981 by the deliveries of five Alpha jets and by three piston engine Aerospatiale TB-30 Epsilons in 1986. The Fouga Magisters were returned to France in 1985.

	
During its existence the official name changed from Section Air der Forces armées in 1964 to Escadrille Nationale D Togolaise (ENT) in 1973, to Groupement Aerienne Togolais (GAT) in 1980, and finally to Armée de l'Air Togolaise in 1997.
	
At present its operations are concentrated in the Lomé Transport Base at Lomé Tokoin Airport, where the transport aircraft are based, and the Niamtougou Fighter Base at Niamtougou International Airport, where the combat units are located.

It acquired the Bayraktar TB2 UCAV from Turkish company Baykar in August 2022.

Aircraft

Current inventory

Navy 

It currently has 2 wooden-hulled patrol boats, the Kara (P 761), and the Mono (P 762), which have both been in service since 1976. On 7 July 2014, the Republic of Togo navy received a RPB 33 patrol boat that was named Agou (P 763). Currently, the navy's chief of staff is ship captain Atiogbé Ametsipe.

Equipment

References
Aircraft information files Brightstar publishing File 338 sheet 4

External links
 

Military of Togo